HMS Ambuscade was a 40-gun fifth rate frigate of the Royal Navy. She had formerly been the French ship Embuscade, captured in 1746.

Embuscade was a one-off 38-gun design by Pierre Chaillé, with 26 × 8-pounder and 12 × 4-pounder guns and was launched at Le Havre on 19 March 1745.

Ambuscade fought at the First Battle of Cape Finisterre on 3 May 1747, commanded by Captain John Montagu. She captured the privateer Vainqueen on 12 July 1757, and fought with Edward Boscawen against Jean-François de La Clue-Sabran at the Battle of Lagos on 19 August 1759. She was sold at Deptford in 1762 to private adventurers.

References

1745 ships
Frigates of the Royal Navy
Sailing frigates of the French Navy
Age of Sail frigates of France
Ships built in France
Captured ships